Alexander M. Dunphy, Jr. (October 23, 1928 – 1999) was a businessperson and politician in Newfoundland. He represented St. George's in the Newfoundland House of Assembly from 1971 to 1975.

The son of Alexander M. Dunphy and Isabella McLellan, he was born in Curling and was educated at Saint Bonaventure's College and Saint Francis Xavier University. In 1962, Dunphy married Mary Elizabeth Burton. He served as mayor of Steady Brook from 1970 to 1971. Dunphy served on the executive of the Progressive Conservative Association from 1968 to 1971.

References 

1928 births
1999 deaths
Progressive Conservative Party of Newfoundland and Labrador MHAs
Mayors of places in Newfoundland and Labrador